The GPA Footballer of the Year was awarded annually by the Gaelic Players Association, as part of the Opel Gaelic Players awards scheme, established in 2006.

History
The title was first awarded in 2001, at the foundation of the association, and was first sponsored in 2005, also by Opel. The award honoured the achievements of a Gaelic footballer of outstanding excellence for each season. At the end of the Football Championship the association members voted on for the award recipient. As the award was voted on by the players it was often viewed as one of the greatest individual honours. Unlike other GAA awards the GPA Footballer of the Year was presented with a prize which has the monetary value of a new car.

The GPA Footballer of the Year award has since been merged with the All Stars Footballer of the Year.

Winners

References

External links
 GPA Awards Announced
 2006 Award

2001 establishments in Ireland
Awards established in 2001
Gaelic football awards
Footballer of the Year